The City Square Park Bandstand, at 100 S. 9th St. in Humboldt, Kansas, was built in 1907.  It was listed on the National Register of Historic Places in 2014.

It is an octagonal bandstand with an asphalt roof and a spire, located at the center of City Square Park, a one-block park.  Charles M. Smith designed the bandstand and John Nessel contracted to build it.

References

Buildings and structures on the National Register of Historic Places in Kansas
Buildings and structures completed in 1907
Allen County, Kansas
Bandstands in the United States